The list of Southeastern Conference national championships begins in 1933, the first year of competition for the Southeastern Conference (SEC), and includes 214 team national championships sanctioned by the National Collegiate Athletic Association (NCAA), and four additional national championships sanctioned by the Association for Intercollegiate Athletics for nonWomen (AIAW), won by current conference members through the end of the 2021–22 school year. SEC members won seven national championships in 2021–22: Georgia in football, Florida in three of the four track & field championships (women's indoor and outdoor for both men and women), Kentucky in rifle, South Carolina in women's basketball, and Ole Miss in baseball.

The SEC has averaged almost seven national championships per year since 1990.

Listed below are all championship teams of NCAA-sponsored events, as well as the titles won in football and equestrian, which are not official NCAA-sanctioned championships. Conference members have won at least one title in every sponsored sport in which the SEC participates. Kentucky completed this feat by winning the 2020 National Championship in women's volleyball on April 24, 2021. Between 1979 and 1982, teams representing current member universities also claimed four AIAW Championships. Logan Durham claims a mascot national championship at the University of Tennessee.

Fall sports

Football (43 claimed)
Schools don't necessarily claim each of the championships listed.

Pre-SEC
Prior to 1932, Vanderbilt was named national champion in football in 1921 and 1922 by Berryman.
Prior to 1932, LSU was named national champion in football in 1908 by the National Championship Foundation.
Prior to 1932, Auburn was named national champion in football in 1913 by Billingsley and 1914 by Howell.
Prior to 1932, Alabama claimed national championships in football in 1925, 1926, and 1930.
Prior to 1932, Georgia was named national champion in football in 1920 by Berryman and 1927 by the Boand and Poling polls.
Prior to 1932, former member Georgia Tech claimed football national titles in 1917 and 1928.
Prior to joining the SEC in 1992, Arkansas claimed the 1964 football national championship awarded by the Football Writers Association of America (FW) and Helms Athletic Foundation (Helms) polls. Arkansas has 1 more unclaimed national title in 1977 awarded by the Rothman (FACT) poll.
Prior to joining the SEC in 2012, Texas A&M claimed national titles in 1919, 1927, and 1939. The 1919 title was awarded by Billingsley Report (BR) and the National Championship Foundation (NCF). The 1927 title was awarded by the Sagarin Ratings (SR). The 1939 title was awarded by the AP poll.
 Future SEC member Oklahoma, set to join in 2024, officially claims 7 national titles, with 11 more unclaimed titles.
 Future SEC member Texas, set to join alongside Oklahoma, officially claims 4 national titles, with 5 more unclaimed titles.
Bold type indicates title is officially claimed by the university.

Men's cross country (8)

Prior to joining the SEC in 1992, Arkansas won four titles in men's cross country.

Women's cross country (2)
Future SEC member Texas has won one team title in women's cross country (1986).

Women's soccer (1)

Women's volleyball (1)
Future SEC member Texas has won three national titles in women's volleyball (1988, 2012, 2022).

Men's soccer (0)
The SEC has never sponsored men's soccer; only two current members, Kentucky and South Carolina, sponsor the sport. After more than a decade as Conference USA rivals, both teams moved to the Sun Belt Conference for 2022 and beyond. Their annual derby is nicknamed the "Southeastern Conference Championship Game".

Winter sports

Men's basketball (11 official)

The NCAA did not sanction a postseason tournament to determine a national champion until 1939. Some schools claim basketball national championships based on polls for seasons prior to 1939, but those are not listed here.

Note: LSU claims a basketball national championship on the basis of a win in the 1935 American Legion Bowl, though the event made no claim to determine a national champion. Kentucky also claims the 1933 title, based on the Helms poll. Neither of these claimed titles are officially recognized by the NCAA and thus are not listed here.

Women's basketball (10)
Prior to joining the SEC in 2012, Texas A&M won one women's basketball title (in 2011).
Future SEC member Texas won one women's basketball title in 1986.

Men's gymnastics (0)
The SEC has never sponsored men's gymnastics. Future member Oklahoma has won 12 team titles in that sport.

Women's gymnastics (20)
Future SEC member Oklahoma has won five team titles in women's gymnastics.

 *** Florida shared the 2014 national title with future SEC member Oklahoma.

Note before 1981, the Association for Intercollegiate Athletics for Women (AIAW) was the sole governing body for women's intercollegiate athletics and sponsored national championships in women's sports. Starting in 1981, the National Collegiate Athletics Association (NCAA) began to sponsor women's athletic championships as well as those for men's sports. During the 1981–82 school year, the AIAW and NCAA both sponsored championships in several women's sports. Starting in 1982–83, the NCAA became the sole sponsor of women's intercollegiate sports championships and national championships in those sports.

Men's indoor track and field (20)

Prior to joining the SEC in 1992, Arkansas won eight titles in men's indoor track.
Prior to joining the SEC in 2012, Missouri won one title in men's indoor track.
Future SEC member Texas won one men's indoor track title in 2022.

Women's indoor track and field (18)
Future SEC member Texas has won six titles in women's indoor track and field (1986, 1988, 1990, 1998, 1999, 2006).

Men's swimming and diving (11)
Future SEC member Texas has won 15 team titles in men's swimming & diving (1981, 1988, 1989, 1990, 1991, 1996, 2000, 2001, 2002, 2010, 2015, 2016, 2017, 2018, 2021)

Women's swimming and diving (15)
Future SEC member Texas has won 7 team titles in women's swimming & diving (1984, 1985, 1986, 1987, 1988, 1990, and 1991).

Note before 1981, the Association for Intercollegiate Athletics for Women (AIAW) was the sole governing body for women's intercollegiate athletics and sponsored national championships in women's sports. Starting in 1981, the National Collegiate Athletics Association (NCAA) began to sponsor women's athletic championships as well as those for men's sports. During the 1981–82 school year, the AIAW and NCAA both sponsored championships in several women's sports. Beginning in 1982–83, the NCAA became the sole sponsor of women's intercollegiate sports championships and national championships in those sports.

Women's bowling (2)

Note that the SEC does not sponsor bowling. Vanderbilt won its first title as an independent and its second as a member of the single-sport Southland Bowling League.

Rifle (4)

Note that the SEC does not sponsor rifle. Kentucky is a member of the single-sport Great America Rifle Conference.

Men's wrestling (0)
The SEC sponsored wrestling from 1969 to 1981, but no member won an NCAA team title during the existence of SEC wrestling. Future SEC member Oklahoma has won seven national team championships in that sport. Current SEC member Missouri is currently a wrestling-only member of the Big 12 Conference, in which it had been a full member before joining the SEC in 2012.

Spring sports

Baseball (14)
One current and two future SEC members have won national titles before joining the conference:
 Prior to joining the SEC in 2012, Missouri won one national title (in 1954).
 Future member Oklahoma won titles in 1951 and 1994.
 Future member Texas won six titles (1949, 1950, 1975, 1983, 2002, and 2005).

Softball (3)
One current and one future SEC member have won national titles in softball before becoming SEC members:
 Prior to joining the SEC in 2012, Texas A&M won one AIAW title (1982) and two NCAA titles (1983 and 1987).
 Future member Oklahoma has won six NCAA titles (2014, 2016, 2017, 2019, 2021, 2022).

Men's outdoor track and field (21)

Prior to joining the SEC in 1992, Arkansas won one title in men's outdoor track.
Prior to joining the SEC in 2012, Texas A&M won three titles in men's outdoor track.

 * Arkansas was forced to vacate the NCAA titles won in 2004 and 2005 because of recruiting violations with Tyson Gay. Florida finished second both years.

 *** Texas A&M and Florida finished tied for the national title at the 2013 NCAA Outdoor Track and Field Championship.

Women's outdoor track and field (18)
Prior to joining the SEC in 2012, Texas A&M won three titles in women's outdoor track.
Future SEC member Texas has won four titles in women's outdoor track and field (1986, 1998, 1999 and 2005).

 LSU was forced to vacate the 2012 Women's Outdoor Track and Field Championship due to positive testing for banned substances in one athlete.

Men's tennis (8)
Future SEC member Texas has won one title in men's tennis (2019).

Women's tennis (10)
Future SEC member Texas has won four titles in women's tennis (1993, 1995, 2021 and 2022).

Men's golf (13)
 Prior to joining the SEC in 2012, Texas A&M won one national title (in 2009).
 Future SEC member Oklahoma has two national titles (1989 and 2017).
 Future SEC member Texas has four national titles (1971, 1972, 2012 and 2022).

Women's golf (5)

Women's rowing (0)
The SEC has never sponsored women's rowing; only two current members, Alabama and Tennessee, sponsor the sport, both competing as single-sport Big 12 members. The two future members, Oklahoma and Texas, both sponsor the sport, and Texas has won two NCAA titles (2021 and 2022).

Defunct NCAA championships

Men's boxing (1)

NCAA emerging sports

Equestrian (15) 
The NCAA does not yet sanction a championship for Equestrian. The following is a list of non-NCAA championships won by SEC schools. The SEC began sponsoring equestrian as a conference sport during the 2012–13 school year, with Auburn, Georgia, South Carolina and Texas A&M participating.
 Before joining the SEC in 2012, Texas A&M won two national titles (in 2002 and 2012).

NCAA team championships

Through March 14, 2023

The table above ranks the current SEC schools by the number of NCAA recognized national championships each school has won. This does not include Division I-A/FBS football championships, equestrian championships, or unofficial championships in other sports such as men's basketball. However, it does include AIAW titles, which the NCAA has retroactively recognized as equivalent to its own national championships. The totals below include any championships that may have been won before the school was a member of the SEC.

In addition, some recognized national championships are in sports that are not (or were not) sponsored by the SEC:
 Kentucky's total includes four championships in rifle, which the SEC has never sponsored.
 Vanderbilt's total includes a national title in women's bowling, another sport yet to be sponsored by the SEC.

References
9. https://lsusports.net/ncaachamps/

National champions
Southeastern Conference